The 2017 Wheelchair Doubles Masters (also known as the 2017 Uniqlo Wheelchair Doubles Masters for sponsorship reasons) is a wheelchair tennis tournament played at the Sportcentrum de Schaapskooi in Bemmel, Netherlands, from 22 to 26 November 2017. It is the season-ending event for the highest-ranked wheelchair tennis doubles players on the 2017 ITF Wheelchair Tennis Tour.

Tournament
The 2017 Uniqlo Wheelchair Doubles Masters took place from 22 to 26 November at the Sportcentrum de Schaapskooi in Bemmel, Netherlands. It was the 18th edition of the tournament (15th for quad players). The tournament is run by the International Tennis Federation (ITF) and is part of the 2017 ITF Wheelchair Tennis Tour. The event takes place on indoor hard courts. It serves as the season-ending championships for doubles players on the ITF Wheelchair Tennis Tour.
The eight pairs who qualify for the men's event and six pairs who qualify for women's event are split into two groups of three or four. The four pairs who qualify for the quad event compete in one group. During this stage, pairs compete in a round-robin format (meaning pairs play against all the other players in their group).
In the men's and women's events the two pairs with the best results in each group progress to the semifinals, where the winners of a group face the runners-up of the other group. In the quad event, the top two pairs progress to the final. This stage, however, is a knock-out stage.

Format
The Wheelchair Doubles Masters has a round-robin format, with eight men's pairs, six women's pairs and four quad pairs competing. The seeds are determined by the UNIQLO Wheelchair Tennis Rankings as they stood on 9 October 2017. All matches are the best of three tie-break sets, including the final.

Qualified pairs
The following pairs qualified for the 2017 Wheelchair Doubles Masters, based upon rankings as at 9 October 2017. Players whose names are struck out qualified but did not participate and were replaced by the next highest ranking player.

Men's Doubles

Women's Singles

Quad Singles

Champions

Men's doubles

 Alfie Hewett /  Gordon Reid def.  Stéphane Houdet /  Nicolas Peifer, 1–6, 6–4, 7–5

Women's doubles

 Marjolein Buis /  Diede de Groot def.  Sabine Ellerbrock /  Aniek van Koot, 6–2, 6–4

Quad doubles

 Nick Taylor /  David Wagner def.  Antony Cotterill /  Andrew Lapthorne, 6–4, 6–3

See also
ITF Wheelchair Tennis Tour
2017 Wheelchair Tennis Masters

References

External links
 
 ITF tournament profile

Masters, 2017